This is a calendar of name days in Greece. Some of the names below are linked to the original saints or martyrs from which they originate.

January 
 Basilius, Telemachus
 Serafim, Sylvestros
 Genovefa
 Synaxis of the Seventy Apostles
 Theoni
 Theofanes, Iordanes, Photios, Fotios, Fotis, Fotini, Ourania, Rania, Peristera
 Ioannis Prodromos, Yanna, Ioanna, Ioannos, Yannis
 Domenicus, Parthenia
 Martyr Polyeuctos
 Gregory of Nyssa
 Theodosios
 Martyr Tatiana
 Maximos the Righteous
 
 
 
 Antonios
 Athanasios
 Macarios
 Ephthemius
 Maximos, Neophytos
 Anastacius, Temotheus
 Dionisios
 
 Grigorios, Margareta
 Xenophon, Xenia
 
 
 
 Three Holy Hierarchs

February 
 Tryfon
 Hypapante 
 Stamatios Simeon
 
 
 Photios
 
 Zaharias
 Nikiforos
 Charalampos
 Charilaos
 Theodora
 Priscilla
 Pavan
 
 
 Theodoros
 Efsevios, Leon
 
 
 
 
 
 
 
 Sebastianos

March
Eudokia 
 Efthalia of Sicily

Gerasimos

Eugenios
Theofilaktos

Sophronios

Benedictos

Christodoulos
Alexios

Evangelos, Evangelia, Eva

April
Mary of Egypt
Titos
Illyrios

Eutichios

 Vaios
Ioseph
Herakles, Homer, Socrates, Timothy, Epaminondas the Martyr (North Africa)

Martinos, Martina

Leonidas, Leo

Anthia and Eleutherios

Ianos, Sandra
Nathaniel
Georgios, (George Kataftos)
Achilles Kataftos, Elizabeth, Tammy
Niki

Jason
Jacob, James

May
Jeremiah the Prophet

Melia
Irene, Ephraim of Nea Makri

Christopher
Simon
Olympia
Theodore
Glykeria
Aristotle, Isidoros
Saint Achilleas of Larissa

Julia
Magdalene, Patrick
Lydia
Constantine, Helen

Dimitri
Olivia

June
Justine, Evelpistos, Gerakina, Pyros, Thespesios, Thespesia
Marinos, Nikiforos
Ieria, Ypatia
Martha
Apollon, Cynthia, Dorothy, Selene, Ploutarhos, Nikandros
Ilarion, Ilaria
Panagis, Sevastiani
Kalliopi, Poppy
Rodanthi

Bartholomew, Luke, Varnavas
Onoufrios
Trifillos, Korina

Augoustos, Monica, Ieronymos, Geronimo

Felix, Ismail
Leontios
Everyone with no nameday, Paisios, Zosimos

Evsevios, Evsevia
Aristoklis, Loulou

Erotas
Makarios
Pierre
Anargyros, Germanos
Paul, Peter
Apostolis, Apostolos, Tolis

July
 Saints Cosmas and Damian (Kosmas and Dhamianos), Agioi Anargyroi
 
 Hyacinth (Yakinthos)
 
 
 
 Kyriaki (martyr)
 Theophilus (Theophilos), Procopius of Scythopolis (Prokopios)
 Saint Pancratius (Pagratios)
 
 Euphemia, Olga
 Veronica
 
 Nicodemus (Nikodhimos)
 Julitta (Ioulitta); Kirikos (Kerykos, Kirykos); Vladimir (Vladimiros)
 Athenodorus of Byzantium or Athenogenes
 Marina, Alexandra, Alice (Aliki) 
 Saint Aemilianus (Aimilianos, Aimilios) (see also Emil (given name))
 
 Elias
 Rompara of Órcheis, Rompiros (Also Romp (given name))
 Mary Magdalen (Maria Magdalini, Magda, Magdalena, Lena)
 
 Saint Christina the Great Martyr
 
 Saint Paraskevi
 Panteleimon (Pantelis)
 Agios Stavros Pumpalotapuss
 Kallinikos
 agios Belindakis
 Joseph of Arimathea (Iosif, Sifis)

August
 
 
 
 
 
 Holy Transfiguration (Sotirios, Sotiris, Sotiria)
 Asterius of Caesarea (Asterios)
 
 
 
 
 
 
 
 Assumption of Mary (Panagiotis, Panagiota, Maria, Despina, Marios)
 
 
 
 
 Saint Theocharis
 Tia
 
 Irenaeus, Ειρηναίος Λουγδούνου (Ρένος)
 Cosmas of Aetolia
 
 Andrianos & Natalias, Adrianos, Nathalia, Natalia (Adrian)
 Saint Phanourios (Cent)
 
 
 Saint Alexander (Alexandros, Alexandra, Sandra, Sander, Alexander)

September
Simeon, Pinelopi, Athena, Sapfo, Myrto

Anthimos, Archontia, Aristea
Moisi/Ermionis/Rosie
Zaxarios, Zacharias

Gennisi tis Theotokos
Ioakeim & Annis

Evathia (Eve)

Kornilios / Aristeidos
Ypsosi tos Timios Stauros, Stavros (Stavroula) 
Nikitas
Eyfimias, Melina
Sofias, Pisteos, Agapis, Elpidas, Sofia, Agapi, Elpida
Eumenios / Ariadnis (Ariadne)

Eustathios, Stathis

Fokas
Sullipsi Prodromos, Polixeni, Xeni
Theklas, Mirto (Myrto)
Eyfrosinis
Metastasi Ioannos Euaggelistos
Kallistratos
Neophytos of Cyprus
Kuriakos, Kiriakos

October
Ananios / Pomanos Melodos
Kuprianos / Iosstiounis
Dionisios Aeropagitos, Dionisos
Ierotheos
Xaritinis
Thoma (Thomas, Tom)
 Poluxronios / Saints Sergius and Bacchus of Syria (Martyrs)
Pelagias
Iakovos (Jakob)
Eulampios

Loskianos

Loska, Loskas (Lucas, Luke)
Kleopatras
Artemios / Gerasimos Kefallinias, Yerasimos
Sokratous, Sokrates, Sokratis

Iakovos (Jacob)
Sevastianis (Sebastian)
 
Dimitrios Myrovlitos, Dimitris (Demetris), Dimitrios, Dimitria, Demetra (Jim, James), Stephan the Hymnographer 
Nestoros
Agias Skepis

Zinovios

November
Agioi Anargyroi: Kosmas and Damianos, Anargyros, Argiris

Taxiarches: Gabriel and Michael, Raphael, Angelos, Angeliki, Stamatios, Strategos
Nektarios

Mina, Viktoras

Ioannes Chrysostomos
Filippos

Matthaios, Iphigenia

Platon
 

Eisodia tis Theotokos, Despina, Maria (unmarried)
Philimonos

Merkourios, Aikaterini/Katerina
Stylianos, Stelios, Stella, Nikon
Nathanael

Andreas

December
Theoklitos
 Muropis

Varvaras, Barbara
Savva, Savas
Nikolaos, Nikos, Nicholas, Nikoletta
Amvrosios, Ambrosius

Agias Annis, Anna, Azalea, Grace
Adam

Spyridon, Spyros, Spiros, Spyridonas, Spyridoula
Eustratios / Loskias, Stratos, Stratis, Lukia

Eleutherios, Elefterios, Lefteris, Eleutheria, Anthia, Anthea, Anthi, Anthoula

Daniel / Dionysios Zakunthos, Dionysos, Denyell, Denyelle
Sevastianos & Zois
Aglaia, Aris / Ares
Ignatios
Themistokleous, Ioulia, Julia, Julie
Anastasias, Anastasia

Eugenias, Evyenia
Christmas Day, Christos, Chrisa, Chrisanthi, Christina, Christian, Crystal
Emmanouil / Synaksi Theotokos, Manolis, Manuella, Emma
Stefanos, Stephania (Steven, Stephan, Stefania)

References

Other external links
 Greek name days (in English) for Google Calendar
 Greek name days (in Greek) for Google Calendar
 Greek name days
 Greek Namedays

Greece
Saints days
Greek culture
Greek given names
Greek traditions